Agonopterix divergella is a moth in the family Depressariidae. It was described by Aristide Caradja in 1920. It is found in the Russian Far East.

References

Moths described in 1920
Agonopterix
Moths of Asia
Taxa named by Aristide Caradja